is a Japanese race car driver. Hirate has won the Super GT series twice.

Career
Hirate began karting in 1999 when he was 13.  After winning the All Japan Junior Kart Championship, coming third and fifth in the All Japan Kart Championship and coming third in the FIA Oceania Championship, he moved on to Formula Toyota, where he raced for the Tom's Spirit team and came second with four wins to his name.

In 2003, he moved to Formula Renault, at the Prema Power team.  In his two-year spell here he won 7 races and came second in the 2004 season.  In 2004 he also raced for Prema Power's Formula Three Euroseries team twice, and in 2005 made the decision to race here.  After coming twelfth for Team Rosberg, he was made a Toyota F1 test driver in 2006 and came third in the Formula Three Euroseries.  In 2007 he continued as a Toyota test driver  and also drove for GP2 team Trident Racing.

Hirate returned to Japan in 2008, where he competed in both Formula Nippon and Super GT. He finished fourth in the 2008 Formula Nippon season and fifth in 2009, both times driving for Team Impul.

Racing record

Career summary

 * Season still in progress.

Complete GP2 Series results
(key) (Races in bold indicate pole position) (Races in italics indicate fastest lap)

Complete Formula Nippon/Super Formula results
(key) (Races in bold indicate pole position) (Races in italics indicate fastest lap)

Complete Super GT results

‡ Half points awarded as less than 75% of race distance was completed.
* Season still in progress.

References

External links
 Kohei Hirate official website

Living people
1986 births
People from Komaki, Aichi
Japanese racing drivers
GP2 Series drivers
Formula Nippon drivers
Super GT drivers
Formula 3 Euro Series drivers
Italian Formula Renault 2.0 drivers
Formula Renault Eurocup drivers
German Formula Renault 2.0 drivers
Dutch Formula Renault 2.0 drivers
Asian Formula Renault Challenge drivers
Super Formula drivers
Prema Powerteam drivers
Team Rosberg drivers
Manor Motorsport drivers
Trident Racing drivers
Nismo drivers
Kondō Racing drivers
B-Max Racing drivers